The 2011 Seguros Bolívar Open Medellín was a professional tennis tournament played on clay courts. It was the eighth edition of the tournament, which is part of the 2011 ATP Challenger Tour. It took place in Medellín, Colombia between 31 October and 6 November 2011.

Singles main draw entrants

Seeds

 1 Rankings are as of October 24, 2011.

Other entrants
The following players received wildcards into the singles main draw:
  Sebastián Decoud
  Felipe Escobar
  Alejandro Falla
  Nicolás Massú

The following players received entry as an alternate into the singles main draw:
  Eduardo Struvay

The following players received entry from the qualifying draw:
  Duilio Beretta 
  Laurent Recouderc
  Agustín Velotti
  Dennis Zivkovic

Champions

Singles

 Víctor Estrella def.  Alejandro Falla, 6–7(2–7), 6–4, 6–4

Doubles

 Paul Capdeville /  Nicolás Massú def.  Alessio di Mauro /  Matteo Viola, 6–2, 4–6, [10–8]

External links
Official Website
ITF Search
ATP official site

Seguros Bolivar Open Medellin
2011 in Colombian tennis
Tennis tournaments in Colombia
Seguros Bolívar Open Medellín